Myotubularin-related protein 6 is a protein that in humans is encoded by the MTMR6 gene.

Interactions 

MTMR6 has been shown to interact with MTMR9.

References

Further reading

External links 
 PDBe-KB provides an overview of all the structure information available in the PDB for Human Myotubularin-related protein 6 (MTMR6)